Delias melusina is a butterfly in the family Pieridae. It was described by Otto Staudinger in 1890. It is found in the Australasian realm, where it is endemic to Sulawesi.

The wingspan is about 78 mm. This species is similar to Delias agostina, but is considerably darker and with wider dark borders on the underside of the hindwings. Females are remarkably similar in appearance to Delias kuehni, but can be distinguished by the black dusting in the basal area.

References

External links
Delias at Markku Savela's Lepidoptera and Some Other Life Forms

melusina
Butterflies described in 1890